Dawonsys is a South Korean company manufacturing rolling stock, display, semiconductor, plant equipment, and environmental systems.  It changed its name to the current one in May 2001 to reflect its parent company.

History
The company was founded in 1996.  In 2001, the company changed its name to its current one, aligning itself towards the parent company.  The company then announced the acquisition of its competitor Rowin Corporation in 2016 and subsequently absorbed in February 2017.  Dawonsys currently employs 261 and exports to countries worldwide.

Products
Notable projects include supplying some of South Korea's rolling stock, which includes several Electric multiple units for some lines in Seoul Metro.

Rail
Seoul Line 2- Seoul Metro 2000 series (fourth generation)
Seoul Line 3- Seoul Metro 3000 series (second generation)
Seoul Line 7- Seoul Metro SR-series
Seoul Line 4- Seoul Metro 4000 series

See also 
 Economy of South Korea
 Hyundai Rotem
 Bombardier Transportation
 Siemens Mobility

References

External links 
 Dawonsys web site

Engineering companies of South Korea
Locomotive manufacturers of South Korea
Rail vehicle manufacturers of South Korea
Companies based in Seoul
Vehicle manufacturing companies established in 1990
South Korean brands
1990 establishments in South Korea